Coffee in Costa Rica may refer to:

 Coffee production in Costa Rica
 Coffee consumption in Costa Rica